The Moorish Wall, also known as the Philip II Wall and formerly the Muralla de San Reymondo is a defensive curtain wall built in the 16th century that formed part of the southern fortifications of the British Overseas Territory of Gibraltar. It was completed by 1575.
The wall ran from the top of a steep cliff above the lower section of the Charles V Wall up the slope of the Rock of Gibraltar to its crest, north of the upper section of the Charles V Wall and is now within the Upper Rock Nature Reserve.

Charles V Wall

In September 1540 an Ottoman force commanded by Barbarossa attacked Gibraltar and took more than seventy prisoners as slaves. The Charles V Wall, originally called the Muralla de San Benito, was built in 1540 to help defend The Rock against further attacks from the south. Starting around 1552 the Italian military engineer Giovanni Battista Calvi made improvements to the wall. Calvi designed a wall that ran west–east in a straight line from the coast for about  until it reached a precipice. A traverse ran north–south along the top of the cliff, and then a zigzag wall ran up to the crest of The Rock.

Construction of the Moorish Wall
Philip II of Spain succeeded Charles V in 1558, and commissioned the Genoese engineer Giovan Giacomo Paleari Fratino to continue the improvements to Gibraltar's fortifications. El Fratino decided that the traverse should be abandoned, and that the work already completed on Calvi's zigzag wall should be demolished. Instead, he believed an upper wall should continue the line of the lower wall from the top of the cliff to the crest of The Rock. El Fratino's upper wall was completed by 1575, running parallel but to the north of Calvi's zigzag upper wall. It runs up the slope of The Rock to the Signal Station.

Work was stopped on the traverse, but Philip II's chief engineer Tibúrcio Spannocchi refused to stop work on the zigzag wall, which was eventually finished in 1599, and forms the upper portion of the Charles V Wall. The traverse wall along the top of the cliff was never built. Thus the Moorish Wall became a fallback defensive line. A 1786 book described the defenses as follows:

References
Notes

Citations

Sources

City walls in Gibraltar